The 1932 Kentucky Wildcats football team was an American football team that represented the University of Kentucky as a member of the Southern Conference (SoCon) during the 1932 college football season. In their sixth season under head coach Harry Gamage, the Wildcats compiled an overall record of 4–5 with an identical mark against conference opponents, finished 11th in the SoCon, and outscored opponents by a total of 116 to 77. The team played its home games at McLean Stadium in Lexington, Kentucky.

Schedule

References

Kentucky
Kentucky Wildcats football seasons
Kentucky Wildcats football